Gospel is an American hardcore punk band. The band was formed in 2003 in Brooklyn, New York by guitarist/vocalist Adam Dooling, bassist Sean Miller and drummer Vincent Roseboom, with keyboardist/guitarist Johnathan Pastir joining the band in 2004. 

Gospel's debut album, The Moon Is a Dead World, was released in 2005 to positive reviews, though the band later broke up in late 2006 due to conflicts over the band's creative direction. The band reformed briefly in 2009 and attempted to work on new material, but disbanded again a year later. In 2018, the band reformed for a third time, and have since released a new studio album, The Loser, in 2022.

Gospel have received notability and acclaim for their unique fusion of progressive rock and hardcore music, and The Moon Is a Dead World has retrospectively been seen as one of the greatest screamo albums of all time.

History

Formation (2003–2004) 
Gospel was formed in 2003 by Adam Dooling, Sean Miller and Vincent Roseboom, who were Brooklyn natives from working class backgrounds, and had lived together on Long Island. The three members had been originally playing together in a late 1990s hardcore punk/screamo band called Helen of Troy. Compared to Helen of Troy's material, the band's song writing was more expansive, expanding beyond hardcore music and into progressive music. In order to help execute the stylistic changes in the band, Johnathan Pastir (also from Long Island) was added to the line-up in 2004 to play keyboards; Pastir had to learn how to play keyboards from scratch.

The Moon Is a Dead World and breakup (2004–2006) 
Gospel recorded their debut album, The Moon Is a Dead World (named after a plaque found in the American Museum of Natural History in New York City), with Kurt Ballou in March 2005, and the album was released in May 2005 on Level Plane Records, the record label owned by Saetia's Greg Drudy. Upon its release, the album received positive reviews; the album has since been seen as a defining release in the screamo genre. Gospel toured heavily around the East Coast of the United States alongside Meneguar in support of the album,  creating a buzz for the band within Level Plane and the music industry. The band gained notoriety for their violent and dramatic live shows; most notably, they were banned from The Owl Music Parlour after a large fire broke out following a performance. Gospel also embarked on a successful tour with Converge in late 2006, which increased the band's mainstream exposure.

After the tour with Converge ended, the band attempted to record several projects, including a studio-recorded version of "The Magic Volume of Dark Matter", a 23-minute long song which they were writing (and had been played live once) in 2006, but none of these projects materialised. Owing to exhaustion, conflicts and infighting between the band members as well as disputes over the band's musical direction, Gospel announced their breakup in late 2006, but did not disclose the reason why at the time. As summarized by Johnathan Pastir, "The unwavering visions everyone had for the band really destroyed the band".

Brief reunion (2009–2010) 
In 2009, it was announced that Gospel had reunited. The band had written an album's worth of material, and originally planned on quietly releasing the album. However, the band changed plans and performed a benefit show for Matty "No Times" Messina, a tattoo artist and former Gospel roadie, who was in need of financial support to cover the medical costs of a liver transplant, on January 29, 2010. The band also revealed they were no longer signed to Level Plane, and that they were planning to release new music in March 2010. The band also released LIVIDII, a compilation of live performances of songs from 2004 to 2006, at the show. Another benefit show was played on April 24, 2010.

The band also released a new single, "Tango", on June 14, 2010. The band attempted to work on an extended play, though this was never completed and the band split again, as, according to Adam Dooling, "We still weren't ready yet".

Second reunion (2018–2021) 
Gospel decided to reunite in 2018 after reconnecting with each other again at the wedding of Matty "No Times" Messina in New York, and with some encouragement from Roseboom's father. They initially planned to finish "The Magic Volume of Dark Matter", but instead ended up writing new material.

In January 2019, The Moon Is a Dead World was remastered by Josh Bonati and reissued on double vinyl, along with updated artwork, by Repeater Records. Later that August, Gospel announced they would be reuniting for a one-off performance at the Saint Vitus Bar in Brooklyn in September, which sold out. The band also played some highly anticipated new songs at the show.

The Loser and MVDM (2021–present) 
In November 2021, Gospel announced their first album in 17 years, The Loser, having already released the single "S.R.O." in October 2021. The song was produced by Kurt Ballou and features him playing the saxophone. The Loser was given a release date of May 13, 2022.

The band performed a benefit show in Brooklyn on January 16, 2022, for Vincent Roseboom's daughter, Alina, who had been diagnosed with pediatric cancer.

On April 20, 2022, the band released another single for the album, "Deerghost". Upon its release, The Loser received positive reviews.

On July 11, 2022, Gospel finally released "The Magic Volume of Dark Matter" under the name MVDM: The Magical Volumes Vol.1: The Magick Volume of Dark Madder.

Musical style and influences 
Gospel has been described by critics as screamo, post-hardcore, progressive rock, grindcore, and hardcore punk. They have also been described as "prog-punk" and "progressive hardcore".

Adam Dooling described their music to Decibel as a combination of all of the member's influences and styles without any compromise;  "If you were to give Vinny a nice suggestion about what to play, you’d be received with nothing but animosity. But we do have respect for each other. Everybody has a specific style that I don't think would work if we were playing with other musicians."  The band members have listed The Beatles, Miles Davis, Nirvana, the 1970 Jesus Christ Superstar rock opera, Team Dresch, Metallica, Mahavishnu Orchestra, Joy Division, The Cure, Yanni, Silverchair, Racebannon, Envy, Jane's Addiction, the Minutemen and Primus as musical influences. The band are also fans of Peter Gabriel-era Genesis, with Roseboom calling them "the most underrated band ever", and the members have cited the band's 1974 album The Lamb Lies Down on Broadway as a musical influence.

The band rejected modern musical tropes of the time; "We’re bored with modern music. If you look through our CD collections, it's like looking through your parents’ collection. Basically, Gospel's sound is the result of four people living under a rock." Gospel also rejected scene culture, especially in the screamo genre they had come out of, with Dooling referring to it as "that sing-scream, white belt and stupid hair shit".

Band members 

 Adam Edward Dooling – vocals/guitar (2003–2006, 2009–2010, 2018–present)
 Sean Edward Miller – bass guitar (2003–2006, 2009–2010, 2018–present)
 Vincent Walter Roseboom – drums (2003–2006, 2009–2010, 2018–present)
 Johnathan Andrew Pastir – keyboards/guitar (2004–2006, 2009–2010, 2018–present)

Discography

Studio albums

EPs

Live albums

Split releases

Singles

External links 

 Level Plane Records website (Wayback Machine)
 Gospel's Discogs page

References 

Gospel
Screamo musical groups
American screamo musical groups
Hardcore punk groups
American hardcore punk groups
Level Plane Records artists
Musical groups established in 2003
Musical groups from Brooklyn
Musical groups from New York City
2003 establishments in New York City
Musical quartets
Musical groups disestablished in 2006
Musical groups reestablished in 2009
Musical groups disestablished in 2010
Musical groups reestablished in 2018